Pindos was a Type III  that was originally built for the British Royal Navy as HMS Bolebroke but never commissioned. Before her completion, she was transferred to the Royal Hellenic Navy and commissioned on 27 June 1942 as Pindos in order to relieve heavy losses of ships sustained by the Royal Hellenic Navy during the German invasion of 1941. Pindos served in the Mediterranean Theatre throughout the Second World War. Konstantinos Engolfopoulos served as executive officer during this period.

The crew of the Pindos were involved in the 1944 Greek naval mutiny. They elected a Revolutionary Commission and circulated a petition demanding that the Greek government-in-exile be expanded to include members of the Revolutionary committee of the National Liberation Front (EAM).

Pindos served during the Greek Civil War, was returned to the Royal Navy in 1959 and broken up for scrap in Greece in 1960.

References

External links 

Hunt-class destroyers of the Royal Navy
Ships built by Swan Hunter
Ships built on the River Tyne
1941 ships
World War II destroyers of the United Kingdom
Hunt-class destroyers of the Hellenic Navy
World War II destroyers of Greece